Uatu mac Áedo (died 600)  was a King of Connacht from the Uí Briúin branch of the Connachta. He was the son of Áed mac Echach Tirmcharna (d. 575). The kinglists place his reign after his father which would put his succession in the year in 575. Prof. Byrne preserves this arrangement but points out that the Annals of Ulster do not name him as king at his death obit and he does not agree that the early Uí Briúin kings held the overlordship in Connacht.

His son Rogallach mac Uatach (died 649) was a later King of Connacht.

Notes

See also
Kings of Connacht

References

 Annals of Tigernach
 Annals of Ulster
 T.M.Charles-Edwards, Early Christian Ireland
 Francis J.Byrne, Irish Kings and High-Kings
 The Chronology of the Irish Annals, Daniel P. McCarthy

External links
CELT: Corpus of Electronic Texts at University College Cork

600 deaths
Kings of Connacht
People from County Roscommon
6th-century Irish monarchs
Year of birth unknown